Colonel Virgil Rasmuss Miller (November 11, 1900 – August 5, 1968) was a United States Army officer who served as Regimental Commander of the 442d Regimental Combat Team (RCT), a unit which was composed of "Nisei" (second generation Americans of Japanese descent), during World War II. He led the 442nd in its rescue of the Lost Texas Battalion of the 36th Infantry Division, in the forests of the Vosges Mountains in northeastern France.

Early years
Virgil Miller was born in San German, Puerto Rico, which is located on the western coast of the island. In 1915, his family moved to San Juan, the capital city of the island, when his father Dr. Paul Gerard Miller, was appointed Commissioner of Education, a position which the senior Miller held until 1921. Miller and his siblings received their secondary education at El Caribe High School in San Juan. During World War I, he served in the Puerto Rico Home Guard, a local militia. In 1920, he received an appointment to the United States Military Academy at West Point from Arthur Yager (1858–1941), who served as Governor of Puerto Rico from 1913 to 1921.

Military career

Miller graduated from the U.S. Military Academy and was commissioned a second lieutenant in the infantry in 1924. He married Ann McGoughran the following year and in 1926 returned to Puerto Rico where he served with Puerto Rico's 65th Infantry Regiment at Camp Las Casas. In 1940, he was transferred to Hawaii, where he served with the 21st Infantry Brigade and later with the 24th Infantry Division stationed on the island of Oahu at Schofield Barracks.

World War II
On December 7, 1941, the Japanese attacked Pearl Harbor and the United States entered the war. In June 1943, Miller was named Executive Officer of the 442nd Regimental Combat Team. The team included the 442d Infantry Regiment, the 522d Field Artillery Battalion, the 232d Combat Engineer Company, the 206th Army Ground Forces Band and the 100th Infantry Battalion from Hawaii's National Guard. The unit was mostly composed of Nisei, second generation Americans of Japanese ancestry who were drafted into service. Some of these men had family members who were still interned in Japanese American internment camps.

Among the campaigns in which Miller participated as either Executive Officer or Regimental Commander of the 442nd RCT were the Rome-Amo, North Apennines and Po Valley Campaigns.

The Battle of Bruyeres (Rescue of the Lost Battalion)
In October 1944, the 1st Battalion, 141st Infantry of the 36th Division, made a push down a long heavily wooded ridge that extended southeast and dominated the valley of Bruyeres, France from Biffontaine to La Houssiere.  The 1st had overextended itself behind enemy lines and had been cut off by strong enemy forces. The 442nd, under the leadership of Lieutenant Colonel Miller, was ordered into the line of combat in an effort to relieve pressure on the 1st Battalion.

On October 26, the 442nd launched its attack and at times had to engage in hand-to-hand combat at a terrible cost of men and material. The 442nd Combat Team was badly battered and without reinforcements, however they were committed to their mission of reaching the 1st Battalion, 141st Infantry of the 36th Division which became known as the "Lost Battalion". Finally, on October 30, after five days of combat, the Combat Team made contact and rescued the men of the "Lost Battalion". The 442nd, according to its commander, Lt. Col. Miller, had lost approximately three times more men (over 800 casualties) than the 211 that were eventually saved. Because of intense German attacks, there was little time to celebrate the rescue together. The 442nd were ordered to pursue the Germans and the "Lost Battalion" men were given a hot meal and put on the lines again. 442nd Regimental Commander Colonel Charles W. Pence, was replaced by Lt. Col. Miller who was promoted to Colonel. On January 5, 1945, Miller was named Commanding Officer of Puerto Rico's 65th Infantry Regiment, but he declined the assignment on January 17 because he preferred to continue with the 442nd Combat Team.

Silver Star citation

The Po Valley Campaign
In April 1945, the 442nd RCT came to the aid of the 92nd Infantry Division and spearheaded a diversionary assault on the western sector of the Gothic Line on the Peninsula Base Section Staging Area at Pisa, Italy.

Field Marshal Albert Kesselring had directed the construction of fortifications, drilled out of solid rock and reinforced with concrete, in the rugged mountains of the Apennines. The German stronghold, contained machine gun nests which produced deadly interlocking fire upon the Allied forces. On April 5, 1945, Col Miller, and 3rd Battalion Commander, LtCol Alfred A. Pursall planned a pincers attack at dawn with the surprise element of an all-night climb of a  mountain face in the dark with full fighting gear, to get in position for an assault.

At the dawn of April 6, Miller's men proceeded on their advance, however the explosions of land mines alerted the Germans and a fierce battle followed. The Gothic Line was cracked after a full day of fighting and by the end of the day, the last ridge link, Mount Cerreta, finally fell. Miller then led the 442nd in the capture of Mt. Fologorito, Massa, a German Naval Base at La Spezia (where they captured a submarine) and Turin.

Col. Miller relinquished his command of the 442nd in June 1945. Among the many decorations which Miller's 442nd Regimental Combat Team including the 100th Infantry Battalion and its members earned were: 21 Medals of Honor, 52 Distinguished Service Crosses (including 19 Distinguished Service Crosses which were upgraded to Medals of Honor in June 2000), 1 Distinguished Service Medal, 560 Silver Stars (plus 28 Oak Leaf Clusters for a second award),more than 4,000 Purple Hearts and 7 Presidential Unit Citations (5 earned in one month). It is believed by many that the 442nd is the most decorated unit in U.S. military history.

At a memorial service held on May 6, 1945, for the men of the 442nd RCT, Col. Miller was quoted as saying:

Later years
Miller served in Italy until 1947 and then served as an Infantry advisor in Turkey. He was a Professor of Military Science and Tactics at Pennsylvania State College, Lehigh University and the University of Michigan. Miller retired from the Army in 1954 and as a civilian became a research associate at MIT, a position which he held until his retirement in 1963.

Colonel Miller died on August 5, 1968, in Ann Arbor, Michigan. He was buried with full military honors at Arlington National Cemetery. The Honor Guard carried the 442nd Regimental Colors which was sent by the 442nd Regiment from Schofield Barracks, Hawaii with the assistance of Senator Daniel K. Inouye. Miller was survived by his widow Ann, two sons William and Richard and his daughter Julia.

Awards and decorations
Among Miller's military awards and decorations are the following:

See also

List of Puerto Ricans
List of Puerto Rican military personnel
Puerto Ricans in World War I
Puerto Ricans in World War II
65th Infantry
Borinqueneers Congressional Gold Medal
German immigration to Puerto Rico

References

Further reading

Puertorriquenos Who Served With Guts, Glory, and Honor. Fighting to Defend a Nation Not Completely Their Own; by : Greg Boudonck; ; 

1900 births
1968 deaths
People from San Germán, Puerto Rico
United States Army personnel of World War II
Puerto Rican people of German descent
Puerto Rican military officers
Puerto Rican Army personnel
Recipients of the Silver Star
Recipients of the Legion of Merit
United States Army officers
United States Army colonels
United States Military Academy alumni
Recipients of the Croix de Guerre 1939–1945 (France)
Recipients of the War Merit Cross (Italy)
Burials at Arlington National Cemetery
University of Michigan faculty